Graziano Calvaresi (born 18 October 1966) is a former Italian male long-distance runner who competed at the 1993 IAAF World Half Marathon Championships at senior level.

Achievements

National titles
 Italian Athletics Championships
 10,000 metres: 1990

See also
 Italian all-time lists - half marathon

References

External links
 

1971 births
Living people
Italian male long-distance runners
Italian male marathon runners
Sportspeople from Rimini